Saint Paterne - Le Chevain is a commune in the department of Sarthe, northwestern France. The municipality was established on 1 January 2017 by merger of the former communes of Saint-Paterne (the seat) and Le Chevain.

See also 
Communes of the Sarthe department

References 

Communes of Sarthe